The 2022–23 season is Kisvárda FC's 5th season in the OTP Bank Liga and the 20th in existence as a football club.

Transfers

Summer

In:

Out:

Source:

Winter

In:

Out:

Source:

Pre–season and friendlies

Competitions

Overview

Nemzeti Bajnokság I

League table

Results summary

Results by round

Matches

Hungarian Cup

UEFA Conference League

Second qualifying round

Third qualifying round

Statistics

Appearances and goals
Last updated on 12 March 2023.

|-
|colspan="14"|Youth players:

|-
|colspan="14"|Out to loan:
|-
|colspan="14"|Players no longer at the club:

|}

Top scorers
Includes all competitive matches. The list is sorted by shirt number when total goals are equal.
Last updated on 12 March 2023

Disciplinary record
Includes all competitive matches. Players with 1 card or more included only.

Last updated on 12 March 2023

Clean sheets
Last updated on 12 March 2023

References

External links
 Official Website
 UEFA
 Fixtures and results

Kisvárda FC seasons
Kisvárda
Kisvarda FC